Syed Hayat Ali Shah Bukhari (12 April 1949 – 2 November 2020) was a Pakistani radio, TV and film artist, dramatist and film director. He wrote more than 200 serials and plays for radio and TV channels. He also served as a journalist and columnist. He was associated with the Sindhi-language Daily Ibrat at the time of his death in 2020.

Early life 
Syed Hayat Ali Shah was born on 12 April 1949 in village Hatri near Hyderabad, Sindh, Pakistan. His father, Syed Ghaus Ali Shah, was a landlord. He received primary education in his hometown, Hatri. One of his teachers, Syed Saleh Muhammad Shah, was a famous radio and TV artist. Young Bukhari was highly inspired by his teacher and decided to pursue a career as an artist and broadcaster. He passed his matriculation examination from Noor Muhammad High School Hyderabad and intermediate from Sachal Arts College Hyderabad.

Radio artist and writer 
He joined Radio Pakistan Hyderabad in 1967 as a drama artist and writer. Bukhari proved himself as one of the best radio dramatists. He penned down more than 200 plays, serials and scripts for Radio Pakistan Hyderabad, Karachi, Khairpur and Larkana. He was a popular radio writer and artist from the 1970s to 2000s. He also served as a host at Radio Pakistan Hyderabad.

Television 
Famous TV producer Haroon Rind introduced him at Pakistan Television Centre Karachi. He wrote many memorable solo plays and serials for Pakistan Television. He also acted in famous TV plays and serials.

Contributions in the film world 
Film director A. Q. Pirzada introduced him in the film world as an actor, writer and director. His first Sindhi-language film was Mahboob Mitha, in which he served as an assistant director. He was also assistant director of Sindhi films Rat Ji Rand, Jeejal Mau, Piyar Tan Sadeqay and Rat Ja Rishta. He was also writer of the films Jeejal Mau and Rat Ja Rishta. Famous singer and musician Inayat Hussain Bhatti invited him to Lahore as a director  and writer of the films Deedar Sajjan and Ghareeban Jo Yaar. Unfortunately both of these films could not be released, perhaps due to lack of funds. He was part of the direction team of the Punjabi film Doghla, which was a popular Punjabi film of the time. He also directed Sindhi film Poti Aien Pag.

Journalist and Columnist 
Bukhari began his career as a journalist in 1988. He wrote hundreds of columns on various topics for a number of newspapers, particularly Sindhi-language Daily Ibrat Hyderabad. His comic columns were very popular among readers. He served as a news editor of Daily Nijat. He then served in different capacities for various Sindhi-language dailies including Sindh News, Khadem-e-Wattan, Kawish and Ibrat. At the time of his death, he was serving as an assistant editor of Daily Ibrat Hyderabad.

Death 
Syed Hayat Ali Shah Bukhari died on 2 November 2020 in Hirabad, Hyderabad. He was buried at Hatri graveyard.

References 

1949 births
2020 deaths
Sindhi people
People from Hyderabad, Sindh
Pakistani radio personalities
Pakistani male writers
Pakistani radio writers
Pakistani radio presenters
Pakistani journalists
Pakistani columnists